Anamalai block is a revenue block of Coimbatore district of the Indian state of Tamil Nadu. This revenue block consist of 19 panchayat villages.

List of Panchayat Villages 

They are,

References 

Revenue blocks of Coimbatore district